Margaret A. Price Findlay is a Trinidad and Tobago lawyer and judge. She has worked primarily in the British Virgin Islands, and since 2009, she has been a High Court Judge of the Eastern Caribbean Supreme Court.

Price Findlay earned a bachelor of laws degree from the University of the West Indies. From 1987 to 1991 she worked as a lawyer in Trinidad and Tobago, and in 1991 she moved to the British Virgin Islands, where she worked as a lawyer, setting up the firm Price Findlay & Co in 1995. Also in 1995, she worked as a magistrate in the courts of the British Virgin Islands.

In 2009, the Judicial and Legal Services Commission of the Caribbean Community appointed her as a High Court Judges of the Eastern Caribbean Supreme Court, with the assignment to reside in and hear cases in Grenada.

References
Eastern Caribbean Supreme Court: Grenada

Living people
20th-century British Virgin Islands lawyers
Eastern Caribbean Supreme Court justices
Trinidad and Tobago emigrants to the British Virgin Islands
Trinidad and Tobago judges on the courts of the British Virgin Islands
Trinidad and Tobago judges on the courts of Grenada
20th-century Trinidad and Tobago lawyers
University of the West Indies alumni
Women judges
Trinidad and Tobago women lawyers
Trinidad and Tobago judges of international courts and tribunals
Year of birth missing (living people)